Hazyview is a sub-tropical farming town in Mpumalanga, South Africa, renowned for its large banana and macadamia nut industries, contributing about 20% of South Africa's bananas and 30% of macadamia output. Bordering the Kruger National Park, the town's name is derived from the shimmering haze that occurs during the heat of summer. Most of the province of Mpumalanga's private game reserves are found just east of Hazyview.

History and demography
This is one of the ancient Mapulana kingdoms under Kgoshi Magashula. Magashula used to command authority in the area before colonisation. It was he (Magashula) who gave Joao Albasini and thousands of his Tsonga followers permission to settle in the area in 1840 in what is known today as Numbi gate and PretoriusKop. For the land at Numbi on the banks of the Sabie River, Albasini gave kgoshi Magashula 200 herd of cattle as a purchase price for the land for chief Manungu his friend, this was after Kgoshi Magashula was satisfied that Albasini and his  Tsonga people were settling on his land with good intentions, that is, to join him in fighting off invading Swazi impis. Joao Albasini, a warmonger and a master of modern warfare, used his Tsonga followers to prevent Swazis from conquering Magashula's land, pleasing Kgoshi Magushula and reassuring him that the Swazis had met their match. Albasini and his Tsonga followers planted wheat on the banks of the Sabie river and established a bakery where fine white bread was produced, which made Magashule's kraal famous in the entire lowveld.

Albasini's Tsonga settlement in the lowveld was known collectively as Magashula's kraal. While at Magashula's kraal,  Albasini's homesteads was based in what is known today as Numbi gate and his Tsonga followers defended his home against invading Swazi impis. The remains of Albasini's home can still be seen today at Numbi gate and is known as 'Albasini Ruins'.

Kgoshi Magashula gave the Tsonga people land to settle at Numbi gate and Pretoriuskop with strict rules, that is, the Tsonga people had to help him to expel and defeat the invading Swazis sent by King Mswati. As the Tsonga settlements spread from Pretoriuskop, Skukuza, Numbi, and other areas east of the current town of Hazyview, the Swazis' plan of conquering Magashula's land failed, because the Tsonga people prevented them from carrying out their military expedition. One such important figure that taught Swazis a lesson was a Tsonga chief known as Manungu, Manungu was a general in Joao Albasini's army and was placed in Pretoriuskop as an Induna. Pretoriuskop was a highly populated area by Tsonga people whose job, as agreed with kgoshi Magashule, was to block the Swazis from entering Magashula's land, Manungu was successful as an induna in safeguarding the land against Swazi invaders. When the Voortrekker leader Pretorius died at Josekhulu, it was Joao Albasini and his followers who conducted the funeral and buried him next to a hill and named the place Pretoriuskop in honour of this brave Voortrekker leader.

With the help of Joao Albasini and thousands of his Tsonga followers, the Swazi's invading tactics were dealt a great blow, the Tsonga's sprawling settlement, starting from Pretoriuskop managed to push back the invading Swazing back to where they came from. With  Mission accomplished and the Swazi impis pushed backed by Albasini and his Tsonga followers, Albasini left Magashula's kraal in 1843 for Luonde ( in Venda) and became a powerful Warlord there, he established a powerful army of 2000 armed Tsonga men whom he used to harass the Venda and their chiefs. As a Warlord in Luonde, Albasini became a white chief of his Tsonga people in the entire area where Tsonga people live and brought in extra thousands of Tsonga settlers from southern Mozambique to take up vast tracts of land starting from Elim Hospital down the escarpment, he also appointed all Tsonga chiefs in the Elim area in order to strengthened his power base at Luonde. He was a feared warlord even the Venda king Makhado did not provoked him because he knew that Albasini possessed thousands of ammunition which he and his Tsonga followers will not hesitate to use at any time against anyone who provoke him.

However, when Albasini departed Magashula's kraal in 1843, many of his Tsonga followers remained behind and continue to support kgoshi Magashula's struggles against invading Swazis. As more and more Tsonga people started to flood Pretoriuskop, Skukuza, and Numbi, the Swazi gradually withdrew their invading tactics due to casualties. The Swazis gave up their fight against kgoshi Magashula because they realized that they can never win the war, for the enemy was now to big to defeat, because the Tsonga people were giving kgoshi Magashula a lot of military support. Tsonga settlements of Manungukop, Pretoriuskop, Skukuza, Numbi, Satara and many more in the southern Kruger were forcibly removed when the colonial government created the Kruger national park between 1899 and 1902.

Today, Hazyview is a home of the Tsonga people, who occupy the north-eastern part of this beautiful town along the banks of the Sabie River. To the south of Hazyview, the Swazi people call this their home. While to the north-western part of this town, the Mapulana people and their cultures are to be found. Sepulana, their language, one of the Northern Sotho language, this is what makes the Mapulana an interesting cultural group in Hazyview.

White Africans also reside in Hazyview. With four cultural groupings in one town, Hazyview is a melting pot of diverse cultures in South Africa's lowveld region.

Land claims
The Mapulana people are currently claiming the whole north-western part of the town until the town of Sabie, from Hazyview to Sabie.  While the Tsonga people, the custodian of South Africa's big five game, are claiming the whole north-eastern part of Hazyview, in particular all the game reserves east of Hazyview and southern Kruger, such as Skukuza, Pretoriuskop, Satara, Protea Hotel Kruger Gate etc. While the Swazi people are claiming the whole southern part of the town.

Geographical information

Hazyview is 12 kilometres from the Phabeni Gate and 40 kilometres from Paul Kruger Gate which leads into the world-renowned Kruger National Park nature reserve home of big 5. Hazyview is also a stop on the Panorama Route, a scenic road. Hazyview is situated 60 km from Mbombela. Nelspruit Town. KMIA, Kruger Mpumalanga International Airport is 56km from Hazyview Town.

References

External links

Populated places in the Mbombela Local Municipality